Luke Scheybeler is a British creative director and entrepreneur best known for his work in sportswear. He is the co-founder and former creative director of the cycling clothing brand Rapha. He is the co-founder of the running apparel brand Tracksmith. Scheybeler runs the branding consultancy Scheybeler+company.

Rapha

Scheybeler co-founded Rapha in March 2004 with Simon Mottram. Scheybeler established Rapha's brand identity, style and product range, leading all creative output for the first 6 years. He led the design and development of the Rapha website. He designed Rapha's distinctive left arm stripe. He worked with photographer Ben Ingham to define Rapha's photographic style.

Tracksmith

Scheybeler co-founded Tracksmith in Boston, Massachusetts, in 2014 with former Puma marketing executive Matt Taylor.

Other work

Scheybeler worked with the Slipstream sports team Garmin Sharp on their branding and team kit design.

References

External links
 Agencies are incredible hothouses of talent - which is why they must die, Marketing Magazine Article
 Rapha website
 Building a brand through creativity, Design Week
 Rapha, Creative Review
 Rapha responds to spoof website, BikeBiz
 The Life and Times of the Cycling Jersey, Radio Show
 Rapha logo blog post
 Finchs Quarterly Review Finchs Quarterly Review, undated. Retrieved 10 February 2009.
 Article on Timothy Everest Collaboration Coolhunting, 27-02-2009 Retrieved 5 March 2009.
 Article on Paul Smith Collaboration Coolhunting, 09-07-2007 Retrieved 7 March 2009.

1974 births
Living people
British designers
People from Lancaster, Lancashire
Artists from London
Alumni of the University of Hertfordshire